Don Henderson (1931–1997) was an English actor of stage, television and screen.

Don Henderson may also refer to:

 Don Henderson (film producer), a pseudonym used by American actor, Tom Laughlin
 Don Henderson (linesman) (born 1968), Canadian National Hockey League linesman
 Don Henderson (folk singer) (1937–1991), Australian folk singer
 Don Henderson (footballer, born 1918) (1918–2010), Australian rules footballer for Footscray in 1944
 Don Henderson (footballer, born 1930) (1930–1999), Australian rules footballer for Footscray in the 1950s
 Donald Henderson (1928–2016), known as D.A. Henderson, American physician and epidemiologist
 Donald Henderson (writer) (1905–1947), English writer.
 Donald Henderson (character) a superhero, better known as Marksman, in the Champions role-playing game; later turned into Donald "Huntsman" Hunter in the spin-off League of Champions comic books

See also
Donald Henderson Clarke (1887-1958), American writer and journalist